Simana "Joe" Mafileo (born 14 September 1969) is a Tongan former rugby union player. He played as centre.

Career
Mafileo debuted for Tonga in the 1995 Rugby World Cup, playing only against Ivory Coast, at Rustenburg. He also played for Tonga Sevens in the first Rugby World Cup Sevens in 1993 and for Japan Sevens in the 2001-02 World Sevens Series. His last international cap for tonga was during the match against Fiji, at Nadi, on 4 July 2003.
At club level, he played for Bay of Plenty, North Harbour, Northland and Kubota Spears.

Notes

External links
Joe Mafileo at New Zealand Rugby History
Simana Mafileo international stats 

1969 births
Living people
Tongan rugby union players
Tonga international rugby union players
Tongan expatriates in New Zealand
Tongan expatriates in Japan
Japan international rugby sevens players